Jang Dok-ryong (born 7 August 1953) is a North Korean former wrestler who competed in the 1972 Summer Olympics and in the 1980 Summer Olympics.

References

External links
 

1953 births
Living people
Olympic wrestlers of North Korea
Wrestlers at the 1972 Summer Olympics
Wrestlers at the 1980 Summer Olympics
North Korean male sport wrestlers
Wrestlers at the 1978 Asian Games
Asian Games competitors for North Korea
20th-century North Korean people